Hartley Newnham is an Australian countertenor. Along with Nicholas Routley he was nominated for the 1991 ARIA Award for Best Classical Album for their album Hermit of Green Light.

Newnham was born in Queensland and studied music in Paris and London. He is a member of La Romanesca and Les Six.

Awards and nominations

ARIA Music Awards
The ARIA Music Awards is an annual awards ceremony that recognises excellence, innovation, and achievement across all genres of Australian music. They commenced in 1987. 

! 
|-
| 1991
| Hermit of Green Light (with Nicholas Routley)
| Best Classical Album
| 
| 
|-

References

External links
Biographical cuttings on Hartley Newnham, singer and musician, containing one or more cuttings from newspapers or journals at the National Library of Australia

Australian musicians
Living people
Year of birth missing (living people)
Countertenors